Benoît Piffero (born 21 May 1987 in Montreal, Quebec) is a rugby union hooker who plays for Atlantic Rock and  Canada.
Piffero made his debut for Canada in 2013 and was part of the Canada squad at the 2015 Rugby World Cup.

References

External links

Living people
Canadian rugby union players
1987 births
Canada international rugby union players
Sportspeople from Montreal
Rugby union hookers